Gerard Egan (born 1930) is Professor Emeritus of Loyola University of Chicago. He was born in Chicago, Illinois on 17 June 1930, graduated from Loyola Academy, Chicago in June 1948, and from Loyola University, June 1953, with the degree of Bachelor of Arts. He studied philosophy at West Baden College in Indiana, then a Jesuit seminary linked to Loyola University, and received a Licentiate in Philosophy in June 1955. From September 1966 to June 1967, he taught French and Spanish at St. Ignatius High School, Chicago, and began teaching philosophy at Loyola University in September 1968.

He later served as Professor of Organization Studies and Psychology and Programme Director for Loyola's Centre for Organization Development.

The eleventh edition of his well known book The Skilled Helper was published in 2018. Other books in the fields of counseling and communication include Interpersonal Living, People in Systems (with Michael Cowan), TalkWorks: How to Get More Out of Life Through Better Conversations (with Andrew Bailey), and TalkWorks at Work: How to Become a Better Communicator and Make the Most of Your Career (with Andrew Bailey). The Skilled Helper is considered the most widely used counseling text in the world.

In Egan's Stakeholders in Change model, stakeholders are divided into nine categories reflecting their attitude to the change and the person promoting the change (the "change agent"):

Partners
Allies
Fellow travelers
Bedfellows
Fence sitters
Loose cannons
Opponents
Adversaries
The voiceless 

In Egan's work on the "shadow side" of organizations, he defined the shadow side as:

See also
 Developmental eclecticismthe counselling framework from Egan's The Skilled Helper

References

21st-century American psychologists
People from Chicago
American educators
Living people
1930 births
20th-century American psychologists